ETM may refer to:

 Encrypt-then-MAC
 Energy and Technology Museum, in Vilnius, Lithuania
 Entercom, an American broadcasting company
 Estuarine turbidity maximum
 European Travel Monitor
 Ramon International Airport, in Israel

See also 
 ETM+, an instrument on the Landsat 7 satellite